Lyndia is a genus of moths of the family Crambidae. It contains only one species, Lyndia cannarum, which is found in Egypt.

References

Crambinae
Crambidae genera
Taxa named by Marie Jules César Savigny